Stanley F. Teele (February 26, 1906May 29, 1967) was the fourth dean of the Harvard Business School.

Born on February 26, 1906, Teele grew up in Somerville, Massachusetts and attended high school there. In September, 1923, he entered Worcester Academy and graduated from there in 1924. He then matriculated at Amherst College, from which he received an A.B. degree in 1928.  In 1930, he received an M.B.A. from Harvard Business School, then in 1933 received a doctorate in commercial science. In 1935, he joined the faculty of the Harvard Business School as a professor of marketing and in 1955 he became fourth Dean there. He served as Dean until 1962, when he stepped down for health reasons. He returned to Amherst College where he was the Treasurer and died in May, 1967.

Memory
Teele Hall of Harvard Business School was renamed in 2000 in his memory.

References

External links
Stanley F. Teele papers at Baker Library Special Collections, Harvard Business School

1906 births
1967 deaths
People from Somerville, Massachusetts
Worcester Academy alumni
Amherst College alumni
Harvard Business School faculty
Businesspeople from Massachusetts
Harvard Business School alumni
20th-century American businesspeople
Business school deans
20th-century American academics